Raza (English: Race) is a 1942 Spanish war film directed by José Luis Sáenz de Heredia, and used as propaganda by the dictatorship of Francisco Franco in favour of the regime and against the supporters of the deposed Second Spanish Republic. It is based on a semi-autobiographical novel by Spanish caudillo Francisco Franco under the pseudonym of "Jaime de Andrade."

The film won the Prize of the National Syndicate of Spectacle.

Plot
The film tells the story of four siblings, Isabel, Pedro, Jose and Jaime, children of the ship captain Pedro Churruca and descendants of Cosme Damián Churruca, "the most wise and courageous sailor of his time." Their father, emulating his illustrious ancestor, dies at the beginning of the film in Cuba, which is still a Spanish colony, in a suicide mission against the United States Navy. Before leaving for martyrdom, however, Pedro was doing his best to convey to his children the inherent spirit in the family name, Churruca, which is the spirit of the Almogávares: "elected warriors, the best representatives of the Spanish race: firm fighters, agile and determined in manoeuvres."

Since his early childhood, Jose has displayed that Almogávar spirit. The same cannot be said for Pedro, in whom we see a constant lust for money and a tendency to lie and cheat. Isabel, for her part, is a model child. Jose goes, like his father, into a military career. Isabel marries a soldier. Pedro, unlike his brother, becomes a deputy Republican and requires his share of the family inheritance quickly, to cover the costs of his political career. The fourth child, Jaime – still a baby when his father died – joins a religious order as a priest.

Civil war breaks out. Isabel is with her husband in the Nationalist area. Pedro and Jose are in the embattled Republican Madrid. Pedro has risen to an important post, apparently in the Ministry of Defence. Jose is captured as a result of his activities as a fifth columnist and sentenced to death, a sentence that his brother, Pedro, worried about himself, does not intend to revoke. Jose was shot by a platoon of ill-spoken and unshaven militiamen, but, by some miracle, he survives. Moved, by a woman who loves him, to the clinic of a doctor who is in favour of Franco, his wounds heal and he acquires a new identity that will allow him to move around the area. Unfortunately, his brother, Friar Jaime, is captured by anarchist militiamen in Barcelona, a Republican area. He is shot dead, along with the other friars, by a mob of militiamen who attack and destroy the monastery. He has the opportunity to save himself by invoking the name of his brother, Pedro (who has been assigned to Barcelona), but true to his surname and his brothers in religion, refuses any privilege.

Jose gets into the Nationalist area, with the help of a dentist who had a "bad past" in leftism, "which gave him influence in that corrupt society." He comes to the Basque front, where he meets his brother-in-law, Captain Echevarría, who feels tempted to desert the Nationalists and cross the lines to meet his wife, Isabel Churruca and his two sons, who are trapped in Republican Bilbao. José avoids this, and soon resolves the situation with a happy ending: Nationalist troops defeat the International Brigades who defend the capital of Biscay, and the family meets.

On the northern front, Franco's army are preparing to attack near Aragon. In Barcelona, Pedro, now dressed in a uniform of the Republican army, is preparing the defence against imminent attack. Pedro confronts the prejudices of a man who has a bad appearance and worse manners, who argues that someone with the surname Churruca can not adequately serve the cause of the Republic. Pedro does not know it yet, but moments later prove that the militiaman was right: a woman visiting him, asks him to provide her with a copy of the status of forces on the front lines of Aragon to give to the nationalists. Pedro, shocked, says he cannot betray his own. The woman replies that "it is not possible to have the murderers of your family and many honorable families as your own". Touched by the argument, Pedro gives her the plans. However, the operation is discovered, to the pleasure of the head badly handled militiaman, and the plans do not reach the powers of the nationalists. Faced with death, Pedro seems to recover that Almogávar spirit that had not managed to penetrate him before. "Even without plans and without arms, the reds steadied themselves," and Franco's troops win the battle.

The film closes with the surviving Churruca family members attending the parade of victory in Madrid, chaired by Franco.

Cast
Alfredo Mayo as José Churruca
Ana Mariscal as Marisol Mendoza
José Nieto as Pedro Churruca
Blanca de Silos as Isabel Churruca
Rosina Mendía as Isabel Acuña de Churruca
Pilar Soler as French spy
Julio Rey de las Heras as Pedro Churruca's father
Luis Arroyo as Jaime Churruca
Raúl Cancio as Luis Echevarría
Manuel Arbó as Señor Echevarría
Juan Calvo as El Campesino
Vicente Soler as Dr. Vera
Fernando Fresno as Padre Palomeque
Antonio Armet as Gen. Vicente Rojo
Pablo Álvarez Rubio as French commander
Fulgencio Nogueras as Adm. Cervera
Domingo Rivas as Engineer Colonel
Manuel Soto as Almirante de la base
Pablo Hidalgo as Don Luis
Ignacio Mateo as Col. Pardo
Antonio Zaballos as Sacerdote
Santiago Rivero as Engineer Captain
Luis Latorre as Dr. Gómez Ulloa
Horacio Socías as Padre prior
Erasmo Pascual as Militiaman #1
Joaquín Regúlez as Volunteer
Raza Zarnad as Volunteer

Further reading
 Jaime de Andrade: Raza : anecdotario para el guión de una pelicula, Barcelona : Ed. Planeta, 1997,

External links
 Raza (1941). The film, online at RTVE.
 

1942 films
1940s Spanish-language films
Spanish biographical drama films
Spanish black-and-white films
Films directed by José Luis Sáenz de Heredia
Francisco Franco
Falangist works
Spain in fiction
Spanish Civil War films
Spanish war drama films
1940s war drama films
1940s biographical drama films
1942 drama films